This is a list of the 32 members of the European Parliament for Romania in the 2019 to 2024 session.

These MEPs were elected at the 2019 European Parliament election in Romania.

List 

On the National Liberal Party list: (EPP Group)
 Rareș Bogdan
 Mircea Hava
 Siegfried Mureșan
 Vasile Blaga
 Adina Vălean – until 30 November 2019Vlad Nistor – since 2 December 2019
 Daniel Buda
 Dan Motreanu
 Gheorghe Falcă
 Cristian Bușoi
 Marian-Jean Marinescu

On the Social Democratic Party list: (S&D)
 Rovana Plumb
 Carmen Avram
 Claudiu Manda
 Cristian Terheș (since 12 May PNȚCD and ECR)
 Dan Nica
 Maria Grapini
 Tudor Ciuhodaru
 Dragoș Benea
 Victor Negrescu – since 1 February 2020

On the Freedom, Unity and Solidarity Party+Save Romania Union list: (Renew)
 Dacian Cioloș (PLUS)
 Cristian Ghinea (USR) - until 23 December 2020
 Alin Mituța (PLUS) - since 28 December 2020
 Dragoș Pîslaru (PLUS)
 Clotilde Armand (USR) - until 3 November 2020
 Vlad Gheorghe (USR) - since 10 November 2020
 Dragoș Tudorache (PLUS)
 Nicolae Ștefănuță (USR)
 Vlad Botoș (USR)
 Ramona Strugariu (PLUS)

On the PRO Romania list: (S&D)

 Corina Crețu
 Mihai Tudose (since January 2020 PSD)

On the Democratic Alliance of Hungarians in Romania list: (EPP Group)

 Iuliu Winkler
 Lóránt Vincze

On the People's Movement Party list: (EPP Group)

 Traian Băsescu
 Eugen Tomac

References

See also 

 List of members of the European Parliament, 2019–2024
 2019 European Parliament election
 Politics of Portugal

Lists of Members of the European Parliament for Romania
Lists of Members of the European Parliament 2019–2024
MEPs for Romania 2019–2024